Patricia Feldman Richardson (born 1944 or 1945, died 2022 or 2023) was a British politician, most notable as the British National Party's first Jewish candidate, though she does not practise Judaism. In 2004, Richardson said the party was not anti-Semitic.

Early life
She grew up in Stoke Newington, the youngest of three sisters; her father came from Romania, while her mother was born in London's East End, of Lithuanian descent.

Political career

BNP
In the 2004 local elections, she won a seat on Epping Forest District Council, representing the Loughton Fairmead ward with a narrow majority of 13. Her husband, Thomas Richardson, also a BNP candidate, won the nearby ward of Loughton Broadway.

In the 2008 local elections, she was elected in the Loughton Broadway ward, covering part of the Debden council estate, with a majority of 123 over Labour. Her old Fairmead seat was lost heavily to the Loughton Residents Association.

From 2009, she was the leader of the BNP group on the local council, but in 2012 local elections lost her seats in both the District and Town Councils. She also served on Loughton Town Council 2008-12.

Under her leadership, the BNP campaigned against Muslim prayer meetings in Loughton, claiming in a leaflet approved by her (the Epping Forest Patriot) that the community hall used would be turned into a mosque. Following allegations of abduction and a firebomb attack on his home, the prayer meeting's organiser accused the BNP. He was subsequently questioned by police on suspicion of perverting the course of justice. Richardson said the BNP was not behind the alleged attacks and told The Guardian, "Firebombing is not a British method. A brick through the window is a British method."

She was the BNP candidate for Epping Forest in the 2010 general election.

For Britain
In the 2019 local elections, Richardson stood in Waltham Abbey Honey Lane ward for the For Britain Movement, coming second to the Conservative Sam Kane. She contested the same ward in 2021, finishing third.

Elections contested
UK Parliament elections

Essex County Council elections

Epping Forest District Council elections

References

External links
 Christopher Walker, "I'm no 'fig leaf' insists BNP's first Jewish candidate", The Times, 11 May 2004
 Leslie Bunder,  "BNP Jewish win" , Something Jewish, 11 June 2004
BNP "LADIES IN THE FRONTLINE", Voice of Freedom No. 70, 2006

1940s births
2020s deaths
British National Party politicians
English people of Lithuanian-Jewish descent
English people of Romanian-Jewish descent
Jewish British politicians
Jewish fascists
English far-right politicians
People from Loughton
People from Stoke Newington
Councillors in Essex